The 1980 Railway Cup Hurling Championship was the 54th series of the Railway Cup, an annual hurling tournament organised by the Gaelic Athletic Association. The tournament took place between 17 February and 17 March 1980.

The championship was won by Connacht who secured the title following a 1-5 to 0-7 defeat of Munster in the final. This was their 2nd Railway Cup title, their first since 1947.

Leinster were the defending champions, however, they were defeated at the semi-final stage.

Results

Semi-finals

Final

Top scorers
Overall

Single game

References

Railway Cup Hurling Championship
Railway Cup Hurling Championship